Flight 63 may refer to:

 American Airlines flight 63, the Richard Reid 2001 failed shoe bomb attempt
 American Airlines Flight 63 (Flagship Missouri), a DC-3 that crashed outside of Centerville, Tennessee on October 15, 1943
 American Airlines Flight 63 (Flagship Ohio), a DC-3 that crashed outside of Trammel, Kentucky on July 28, 1943
 Toa Domestic Airlines Flight 63 (1971) 
 STS-63 (1995) U.S. Space Shuttle mission to the Mir space station

See also
 American Airlines Flight 63 (disambiguation)

0063